Thecotheus is a genus of fungi in the Ascobolaceae family. The genus has a widespread distribution, especially in temperate areas, and contains 17 species.

References

External links

Pezizales
Pezizales genera
Taxa named by Jean Louis Émile Boudier